Salloum Antoun Mokarzel (1881–1952) was an influential Lebanese American intellectual and publisher. He was the younger brother of Naoum Mokarzel who was the founder of Al-Hoda, one of the first Arabic language newspapers published in the United States. Between December 1918 and June 1926, he published and edited "The Syrian-American Commercial Magazine" ("المجلة التجارية السورية الأمريكية"), also known as "The New World" ("العالم الجديد"). In 1926, he founded and published The Syrian World, a magazine that published articles on the history and culture of Greater Syria, which at the time consisted of and referred to the modern day states and territories of Syria, Lebanon, Jordan, and Palestine. After The Syrian World ceased publication as a magazine in 1932, Salloum converted the publication to a weekly newspaper. After Naoum's death in 1932, Salloum took over Al-Hoda, which passed at his death in 1952 to his daughter Mary. The newspaper closed in 1971.

References

1881 births
1952 deaths
American people of Lebanese descent
American publishers (people)
Emigrants from the Ottoman Empire to the United States